Porth-y-Felin is an area of Caergybi, Ynys Môn, Wales, which is 141 miles (226.9 km) from Cardiff and 227.4 miles (365.9 km) from London.

References

See also
List of localities in Wales by population

Villages in Anglesey